Lambeg railway station serves Lambeg in County Antrim, Northern Ireland. The station opened on 1 September 1877.

Service

Extra services run in at peak times, and the service reduces to hourly operation in the evenings.

On Sundays there is an hourly service in each direction.

References

Railway stations in County Antrim
Railway stations opened in 1877
Railway stations served by NI Railways
1877 establishments in Ireland
Railway stations in Northern Ireland opened in the 19th century